The Cayman Islands Athletic Association (CIAA) is the governing body for the sport of athletics in the Cayman Islands.  Current president is H. Delroy Murray.

History 
CIAA was founded in 1980 as Cayman Islands Amateur Athletic Association and was affiliated to the IAAF in 1981.

Affiliations 
CIAA is the national member federation for the Cayman Islands in the following international organisations:
International Association of Athletics Federations (IAAF)
North American, Central American and Caribbean Athletic Association (NACAC)
Association of Panamerican Athletics (APA)
Central American and Caribbean Athletic Confederation (CACAC)
Moreover, it is part of the following national organisations:
Cayman Islands Olympic Committee (CIOC)

National records 
CIAA maintains the Cayman Islands records in athletics.

References

External links
CIAA official website

Cayman Islands
Athletics in the Cayman Islands
Sports governing bodies in the Cayman Islands
1980 establishments in the Cayman Islands
Sports organizations established in 1980
National governing bodies for athletics